The 12.7×108mm cartridge is a 12.7 mm heavy machine gun and anti-materiel rifle cartridge used by the former Soviet Union, the former Warsaw Pact countries, modern Russia, China and other countries. It was invented in 1934 to create a cartridge like the German 13.2mm TuF anti-tank rifle round and the American .50 Browning Machine Gun round (12.7×99mm NATO). 

It is used in the same roles as the NATO .50 BMG (12.7×99mm NATO) cartridge. The two differ in bullet shape and weight, and the casing of the 12.7×108mm is slightly longer, and its larger case capacity allow it to hold slightly more of a different type of powder. The 12.7×108mm can be used to engage a wide variety of targets on the battlefield, and will destroy unarmored vehicles, penetrate lightly armored vehicles and damage external ancillary equipment (i.e.: searchlights, radar, transmitters, vision blocks, engine compartment covers) on heavily armored vehicles such as tanks. It will also ignite gasoline and—since 2019—diesel fuel (experimental "Avers" AP/I round).

Cartridge dimensions
The 12.7×108mm has 22.72 ml (350 grains) H2O cartridge case capacity.

12.7×108 maximum cartridge dimensions. All sizes in millimeters (mm).

Americans define the shoulder angle at alpha/2 ≈ 18.16 degrees.

According to guidelines the 12.7×108mm case can handle up to 360 MPa (52,213 psi) piezo pressure. In C.I.P. regulated countries every rifle cartridge combo has to be proofed at 125% of this maximum CIP pressure to certify for sale to consumers.

Cartridge types

Soviet and Russian 12.7×108 types
 Б-30 / B-30
 First version of 1930. Armor-piercing bullet weighing 49 g and 64 mm long with hardened steel core. Replaced by B-32.
 БЗТ / BZT
 Pre-WW2 armor-piercing incendiary tracer. Replaced by BZT-44.
 Б-32 / B-32 (GRAU# 57-BZ-542, 7-BZ-2)
 Steel-cored  bullet. Main type in use.  Penetrates 20mm NATO medium-hard RHA from 500m at 0° when fired out of DShKM. Penetrates 20mm 2P steel from 100m at 0° when fired out of NSV-12.7.  First produced 1936; named after the B-32 7.62×54mmR ammunition of 1932.
 БС-41 / BS-41
 API bullet weighing 55.4 g and 51 mm long with a cemented carbide (Re8 WC-Co) core. Produced in small quantities at the beginning of WWII for the 12.7 mm Sholokhov anti-tank rifles (PTRSh-41).
 БЗТ-44 / BZT-44 (GRAU# 57-BZT-542)
 APIT with brighter tracer, usually used with B-32. Complemented by BZT-44M (GRAU# 57-BZT-542M) of 2002 with subdued tracer.
 БЗФ-46 / BZF-46
 API bullet with (white) phosphorus. Aircraft MG round.
 БС / BS (GRAU# 7-BZ-1)
 API bullet with cemented carbide (VK8 WC-Co, commonly called a "cermet" in Russian) core, developed in 1972. Ballistics also similar to B-32.
  / MDZ (GRAU# 7-3-2)
 Immediate-action incendiary. Used in belt with B-32 and BZT-44(M).
 12,7 1СЛ / 12.71SL (GRAU# 9-A-4012)
 12,7 1СЛТ / 12.7 1SLT (GRAU# 9-A-4427)
 Tandem / duplex cartridge with two bullets inside, in normal and tracer versions. Developed 1985 for use by helicopter against soft targets.
 12,7СН / 12.7SN (GRAU# 7N34)
 Sniper cartridge (FMJ; AP). Bullet weighs 59.2 g and travels at ~790-800 m/s. Bullet consists of hardened tool steel tip and lead body. Able to defeat lightly-armored vehicles at 1500 m and 10 mm RHA at 800 m. Entered production in the 2000s.
 12.7 Blank (GRAU# 7H1)
 12.7 UCH Dummy (GRAU# 7H2)

Note that some WW2 bullets share designations with ones for 14.5×114mm.

Use

Anti-tank and anti-materiel rifles 
 AMR-2 anti-materiel sniper rifle
 ČZW-127 anti-materiel sniper rifle
 Falcon OP-99 anti-material rifle  
 Gepard anti-materiel rifles
 KSVK anti-materiel sniper rifle
 OSV-96 anti-materiel sniper rifle
 PDSHP anti-materiel sniper rifle
 QBU-10  anti-materiel sniper rifle
 QBU-201
 Snipex M
 SVN-98 experimental anti-materiel rifle
 V-94 anti-tank/anti-materiel rifle
 Vidhwansak anti-materiel rifle
 Zastava M93 Black Arrow anti-materiel sniper rifle
 Zastava M12 Black Spear anti-materiel sniper rifle
 Zijiang M99 anti-materiel sniper rifle
 Zijiang & Poly M99-I/M99B-I/M06  anti-materiel sniper rifle
 Zijiang LR-2/LR-2A  anti-materiel sniper rifle

Heavy machine guns
 6P62 handheld machine gun
 Afanasev A-12.7 heavy machine gun
 DShK heavy machine gun
 Berezin UB aircraft machine gun
 CS/LM5 Gatling machine gun
 M17G 12.7mm hatch machine gun
 NSV heavy machine gun
 Kord heavy machine gun
 Type 77 heavy machine gun
 W85/QJC88 heavy machine gun
 QJZ-89 heavy machine gun
 Zastava M02 Coyote heavy machine gun
 Yak-B 12.7mm Gatling gun
 Zastava M87 heavy machine gun
 Yu-12.7 aircraft gun

See also
 20 mm caliber
 14.5×114mm

References

Maxim Popenker, modernfirearms.net
 Cartridge Plant official site
Tulammo official site
ASVK Kord 12.7×108 and OSV-96 Youtube

Further reading 
 Борцов А.Ю. "Пятилинейный", Мастер-ружье issue 110, May 2006, pp. 56–62

External links
12.7×108 large-caliber cartridges
12.7 mm cartridges for more types
Russian Ammunition Page

Pistol and rifle cartridges
Military cartridges
 
Weapons and ammunition introduced in 1935
Anti-materiel cartridges